Daniël Théodore Gevers van Endegeest (25 August 1793 – 27 July 1877) was a Dutch politician.

Gevers was born in Rotterdam, and died, aged 83, in Oegstgeest.

References
Jhr.Mr. D.Th. Gevers van Endegeest at www.parlement.com

|-

|-

1793 births
1877 deaths
Dutch nobility
Members of the Senate (Netherlands)
Ministers of Foreign Affairs of the Netherlands
Speakers of the House of Representatives (Netherlands)
Independent politicians in the Netherlands
Politicians from Rotterdam
Leiden University alumni